Redemption: For Robbing The Dead is a 2011 American Western independent film written and directed by BYU film professor Thomas Russell and starring Jon Gries, Edward Herrmann, Barry Corbin, Gregg Christensen, Margot Kidder, Rance Howard, and Larry Thomas. Redemption: For Robbing The Dead is based on actual events. The film was given an AML Award.

Plot
The film is based on the experiences of mid-nineteenth century frontier police officer Henry Heath, who finds out that someone has been systematically robbing the graves in the town cemetery, where his own young daughter is buried. In dealing with the criminal, Heath has to look at his own beliefs about justice and redemption.

Cast
 John Freeman as Henry Heath
 David H. Stevens as Jean Baptiste
 Robyn Adamson as Lucille Heath
 Jon Gries as Tom Sutter
 Edward Herrmann as Governor Dawson
 Barry Corbin as Judge Smith
 Margot Kidder as Marlys Baptiste
 Rance Howard as Doctor
 Larry Thomas as Josiah
 Gregg Christensen as Officer Dewey

Festivals
Redemption: For Robbing The Dead was selected to screen at the following film festival:

2011 Heartland Film Festival

References

External links

2011 films
2010s English-language films
American Western (genre) films
American independent films
2010s American films